Pernicious is a Thai-American supernatural horror film directed by James Cullen Bressack, who also wrote the story along with co-writer Taryn Hillin. The film stars Ciara Hanna, Emily O'Brien, and Jackie Moore.

Cast 

 Ciara Hanna as Alex
 Emily O’ Brien as Julia
 Jackie Moore as Rachel
 Russell Geoffrey Banks as Colin
 Sohanne Bengana as Vlad
 Byron Gibson as Byron
 Jared Cohn as Shane
 Sara Malakul Lane as Samorn
 Jack Prinya as Male Nurse
 Wallop Terathong as Sang
 Pixit Sangkaew as Youn Sang
 Irada Hoyos as Vanida
 Todstham Piumsomboon as Tiwa
 Thanchanok Kaewta as Isra
 Chanokporn Suwanposri as Female Shopkeeper
 Warakorn Jitpat as Male Shopkeeper 1
 Supachai Girdsuwan as Male Shopkeeper 2
 Alexandra Merle as Streetwalker
 Boonchu Namjaidee as Doctor

Production 

Pernicious is produced by Benetone Hillin Entertainment, a company formed from the partnership of Daemon Hillin and Benetone Films, a leading production service company in Thailand. The movie was shot completely in Thailand.
Vantage Media International is reported to represent world rights to the movie.

References

External links 

 
 
  
 

2014 films
2014 horror films
2010s supernatural films
American supernatural horror films
Films shot in Thailand
Thai supernatural horror films
2010s English-language films
Films directed by James Cullen Bressack
2010s American films